In Salah or officially Aïn Salah is the oasis town in central Algeria that is the capital of the In Salah Province and In Salah District. It was once an important trade link of the trans-Saharan caravan route. As of the 2008 census it has a population of 32,518, up from 28,022 in 1998, with an annual growth rate of 1.5%, the lowest in the province. The village is located in the heart of the Sahara Desert region of northern Africa.  The name In Salah comes from the term "good well".

Geography
A creeping sand dune on the western edge of town is advancing on the city and cuts In Salah in half.  The dune is moving at a speed of approximately one meter (three feet) every five years.  As buildings are covered by its leading edge, structures at the back of the dune are being gradually uncovered.  When a formerly covered location at the back of the dune once again becomes free, it is established who the past owners were and the building is restored and moved into by relatives.  Four red or violet clay brick ksour (walled villages) are found in the oasis, each having its own citadel.

Climate

In Salah has a hot desert climate (Köppen climate classification BWh), with long, extremely hot summers and short, warm winters, and averages just  of rainfall per year. The Sahara region of Algeria is the source of a scorching, sometimes dusty and southerly wind called the Sirocco which parches the plateaus of northern Algeria for up to 40 days and reaches the Tell coastal region for as many as 20 days. During winter, nights can be chilly and frost is by no means unknown but the days are pleasantly warm, sunny and dry. The absolute records low temperatures are below the freezing point, with  recorded in January and  recorded in both February and December, although freezing temperatures are very rare and don't occur each year. Average annual relative humidity is low with only 24%. The sky is clear all year and cloudy days are very rare. Thereby, the solar irradiation is among the highest found on the planet and the annual sunshine duration is estimated between 3,700 h and 4,000 h. In Salah is often quoted as one of the hottest spots worldwide. With Adrar and Reggane, In Salah forms the "Triangle of Fire" as local inhabitants say due to the extreme desert heat that bakes the region from May to September.

Transport
Air flights via In Salah Airport connect the town with the capital Algiers and other major cities in Algeria. The Bus station of In Salah hosts buses going to the north and south. There is a hotel, a restaurant, an internet cafe and two camping sites located in the city and surrounding area. The town lies at the junction of the Trans-Sahara Highway (also known as the N1 national highway), which leads north to Ghardaïa and Algiers and south to Tamanrasset, and the N52, which leads west to In Ghar and Reggane.

Economy

Aside from oil and gas reserves, the primary economic activities of In Salah are agricultural in nature with irrigation being supplied by artesian wells. The oasis has over 200,000 date palms. The chief produce are dates, fruits and vegetables.  Fruit and vegetable gardens, as well as palm groves, flank the village on its southern and western edges.   These groves are protected from the always advancing sand by hedges.  In Salah is also a centre for nomadic Tuareg.  The In Salah oil and gas fields are home to the In Salah Project, a major component of which includes a facility to remove CO2 from the gas produced.  The CO2 is then re-injected into an underground formation.

Historically, In Salah was formerly a trading town which dealt in slaves, ivory and gold from the south.  These goods were exchanged with European goods from the north.

In February 2016, BP announced further project start up at In Salah Southern Fields. In Salah Gas, a joint venture between Sonatrach, BP and Statoil today announced the start-up of its Southern Fields project. In Salah Gas was the first project in the world to be environmentally certified to the ISO 14001 standard. The ISO 14001 management system development and implementation was conducted by Sonni Gopal.

Education

6.7% of the population has a tertiary education (the highest rate in the province), and another 20.1% has completed secondary education. The overall literacy rate is 80.1%, and is 88.7% among males and 71.4% among females.

Localities
The commune is composed of 11 localities:

In Salah
Ksar Laarab
Ksar Lemrabtine
Deghamcha
El Barka
Igostène
Hassi Lahdjar
Ez Zaouia H. Sidi Belkacem
Sahla Tahtania
Sahla Fougania
Tadjemout

References

External links

 Google Maps World Gazetteer
 http://www.tutiempo.net/en/Climate/IN-SALAH/606300.htm Historical weather records for In Salah

Communes of In Salah Province
Oases of Algeria
Tuareg
In Salah Province